Center High School is a public high school in Kansas City, Missouri. It is the only high school within the Center School District.

Sports Teams

Conference 
Missouri River Valley Conference (MRVC) West

Boys 

 Baseball (Spring Season)
 Basketball
 Cross Country
 Football
 Golf
 Soccer
 Track and Field
 Wrestling

Girls 

 Basketball
 Cross Country
 Soccer
 Swimming and Diving
 Tennis
 Track and Field
 Volleyball
 Wrestling

See also
 List of schools in the Kansas City metropolitan area

References

External links
 

Schools in Kansas City, Missouri
Public high schools in Missouri